Mag Blue House is a historic home near Laurinburg, Scotland County, North Carolina. It was built in 1836, and is a -story, five bay by three bay, frame Coastal Cottage form dwelling, with Federal style decorative elements. It has a one-story gabled roof kitchen/dining room wing. It features a dominant gable roof that extends to shelter the full-width front porch, flush sheathing across the porch facade, and a hall-and-parlor plan.

The building was added to the National Register of Historic Places in 1982.

References

Houses on the National Register of Historic Places in North Carolina
Federal architecture in North Carolina
Houses completed in 1836
Houses in Scotland County, North Carolina
National Register of Historic Places in Scotland County, North Carolina